Frank Northam Harvey (19 December 1864 – 10 November 1939) was an English first-class cricketer. A right-handed batsman who played primarily as a wicket-keeper, he made his first-class debut for Hampshire in 1899 against Derbyshire. Harvey made a single appearance in the 1899 County Championship. He returned to the team in the 1900 County Championship and played two first-class matches, both against Essex.

Harvey died in Southampton, Hampshire on 10 November 1939. Harvey's son Godfrey Harvey played in two first-class matches for the Europeans (India) in 1922.

External links
Frank Harvey at Cricinfo
Frank Harvey at CricketArchive

1864 births
1939 deaths
Cricketers from Southampton
English cricketers
Hampshire cricketers
Alumni of Exeter College, Oxford
Schoolteachers from Hampshire
19th-century English Anglican priests
20th-century English Anglican priests
Heads of schools in England